"The Prime Time of Your Life" is a song by French electronic music duo Daft Punk from their third studio album, Human After All. It was released as the fourth and final single from the album on 17 June 2006 by record label Virgin. The song is also Daft Punk's final single on a studio album with Virgin, and was released with a music video written and directed by Tony Gardner, with makeup effects by Alterian, Inc.

Composition 
A noted characteristic of "The Prime Time of Your Life" is the incremental acceleration of tempo as the track ends. Heather Phares of AllMusic stated, "the schaffel beat [...] gradually overtakes the song, eventually speeding up and devouring it". An early review described the increasing speed effect as resembling Lil Louis, and that the ending sounds akin to a washing machine. The overall structure of "The Prime Time of Your Life" was described by Matthew Weiner of Stylus as being "less a song than [a] framework on which to load more vocoders and trend-jumping schaffel beats."

On Daft Punk's live album Alive 2007, "The Prime Time of Your Life" is put together with "The Brainwasher" from Human After All, as well as with the tracks "Rollin' & Scratchin'" and "Alive" from the album Homework.

Music video 
The controversial music video for the song was written and directed by Tony Gardner. The makeup effects work for the video was designed and created by Alterian, Inc. Gardner's then eleven-year-old daughter Brianna plays the main character, Melody, a young girl who is struggling with anorexia.

At the video's start one can see a swiveling skull moving its jaw. The camera then zooms out revealing that it is a reflection in an eye. The eye blinks and one can see a head of a girl (Melody) watching television. Everyone on the television is shown as a living skeleton in various modes on different programs. Daft Punk makes a cameo appearance in the music video as skeletons being interviewed by a news station on the television.

Melody walks over to her dresser and looks at several photographs. She sees her parents, who are also living skeletons, triggering flashbacks revealing a necklace of some importance. She then looks at a picture of herself (in which she is not a skeleton and appears overweight) playing jump-rope with her friends who are skeletons. Melody goes into the bathroom where she is seen in the mirror with a poster of a skeletal rendition of Britney Spears (the cover image of her greatest hits album) being seen in the reflection. Melody proceeds to take off the necklace and lays it on the sink, then opens a drawer where she discovers a razor blade.

She then begins cutting on her right hand with the blade (no blood appears). With her other hand she pulls the skin off her right hand. In the next shot she begins to cut the skin around her face, then proceeds to tear off the skin so that her head, torso and arms are skinless. She stares at herself in the mirror, and gets flashbacks of her life, then faints (and presumably dies).

Melody's parents, who do not appear as skeletons, find their daughter lying on the bathroom floor (the viewer can only see her legs). The camera then shows the photos on the dresser again but this time everyone appears normal. The picture of the girl with her friends is also different, and the girl is not overweight. In the final shot of the video Melody is shown on the television, as a skeleton, waving at two skeletons holding a jump-rope. She then runs toward them before the television turns off.

The music video was included with the CD and DVD version of the album Musique Vol. 1 1993–2005.

Track listings

References

External links 

2006 singles
Daft Punk songs
Songs written by Guy-Manuel de Homem-Christo
Songs written by Thomas Bangalter
2005 songs
Virgin Records singles
Electronic rock songs